Chittorgarh is one of the 200 Legislative Assembly constituencies of Rajasthan state in India. It is in Chittorgarh district and is a part of Chittorgarh Lok Sabha Constituency.

Member of Legislative Assembly

Election results

2018

See also
List of constituencies of the Rajasthan Legislative Assembly
Chittorgarh district

References

Chittorgarh district
Assembly constituencies of Rajasthan